This is a list of destroyers of the Netherlands navy.

Pre World War II
Wolf class 
Wolf
Fret
Bulhond
Jakhals
Hermelijn
Lynx
Vos
Panter

World War II

Admiralen class 
 (ex-De Ruyter)

Gerard Callenburgh class 
 (commissioned as the German ZH1) 

Tjerk Hiddes (never completed)
Philips Van Almonde (never completed)
British N-class class 
Tjerk Hiddes (ex-Noble) 
Van Galen (ex-Nonpareil)
British Q-class class 
Banckert (ex-Quilliam)
British S-class class 
Evertsen (ex-Scourge) 
Kortenaer (ex-Scorpion)
Piet Hein (ex-Serapis)

After World War II
Holland class (Type 47A)

Friesland class (Type 47B)

Netherlands